For the 1989 film of the same name starring Hulk Hogan, see No Holds Barred (1989 film).

No Holds Barred is a 1952 comedy film starring The Bowery Boys. The film was released on November 23, 1952 by Monogram Pictures and is the twenty-eighth film in the series.

Plot
Sach's head becomes hard and he feels no pain.  As a result, Slip enters him into a wrestling match hoping to win $1,000.  However, Sach's strength has disappeared from his head.  Luckily they discover that it has traveled to his finger, and he wins the match.  Slip decides to enter Sach into more matches, but a rival manager wants to take control.  Slip resists the offer and Sach goes onto become world champion, with his power traveling to various parts of his body, including his elbow and toes.  The rival manager prevents another wrestler from fighting Sach in a charity match so that his wrestler can go against him.  The boys are then kidnapped in the hopes that they will reveal where Sach's power has traveled to.  The escape and Sach enters the ring, not knowing where his power is.  Slip discovers that it in on Sach's derrière, and uses that knowledge to win the match.  In the end, when Slip is about to give Sach a new nickname based upon where his power now lies, Sach says to him, "You say it and we're out of pictures!"

Cast

The Bowery Boys
 Leo Gorcey as Terrance Aloysius 'Slip' Mahoney
 Huntz Hall as Horace Debussy 'Sach' Jones
 David Gorcey as Chuck (Credited as David Condon)
 Bennie Bartlett as Butch

Remaining cast
 Bernard Gorcey as Louie Dumbrowski 
 Leonard Penn as Peter Taylor
 Marjorie Reynolds as Rhonda Nelson
 Hombre Montana as himself

Home media
Warner Archives released the film on made-to-order DVD in the United States as part of "The Bowery Boys, Volume One" on November 23, 2012.

References

External links
 
 
 
 

1952 comedy films
1952 films
American black-and-white films
Bowery Boys films
Monogram Pictures films
Films directed by William Beaudine
American comedy films
1950s English-language films
1950s American films